The South African Railways Class 6E1, Series 9 of 1981 was an electric locomotive.

In 1981 and 1982, the South African Railways placed eighty-five Class 6E1,  electric locomotives with a Bo-Bo wheel arrangement in mainline service.

Manufacturer
The 3 kV DC Class 6E1, Series 9 electric locomotive was designed and built for the South African Railways (SAR) by Union Carriage & Wagon (UCW) in Nigel, Transvaal. The electrical equipment was supplied by the General Electric Company (GEC).

In 1981 and 1982, 85 Series 9 locomotives were delivered, numbered in the range from E2001 to E2085. Like Series 6 to 8, the Series 9 units were equipped with AEI-283AY traction motors. UCW did not allocate builder's or works numbers to the locomotives it built for the SAR, but used the SAR unit numbers for their record keeping.

Characteristics

Orientation
These dual cab locomotives had a roof access ladder on one side only, just to the right of the cab access door. The roof access ladder end was marked as the no. 2 end. A corridor along the centre of the locomotive connected the cabs which were identical apart from the fact that the handbrake was located in cab 2. A pantograph hook stick was stowed in a tube mounted below the lower edge of the locomotive body on the roof access ladder side. The locomotive had one square and two rectangular access panels along the lower half of the body and a large hatch door below the second small window to the right of the side door on the roof access ladder side, and only one square access panel and a large hatch door below the first window immediately to the right of the door on the opposite side.

Series identifying features
The Class 6E1 was produced in eleven series over a period of nearly sixteen years. While some of the Class 6E1 series are visually indistinguishable from their predecessors or successors, some externally visible changes did occur over the years.

Series 8 and later locomotives could be distinguished from all older models by the large hatch door on each side. The Series 9 to Series 11 locomotives were visually indistinguishable from each other, but could be distinguished from all earlier models by the rainwater drainage holes on their lower sides. These holes were usually covered by so-called buckets, but the covers were absent on some locomotives. Another distinction was the end doors, which were recessed into the doorframes on Series 9 to Series 11 locomotives, compared to earlier models which had their end doors flush with the doorframes. In addition, on Series 9 and later models, the two side windows on the driver's assistant side were replaced by a single rectangular side window with rounded corners. Finally, unlike all earlier models, all four doors on Series 9 to Series 11 locomotives had rounded corners.

Crew access
The Classes 5E, 5E1, 6E and earlier 6E1 series locomotives were notoriously difficult to enter from ground level since their lever-style door handles were at waist level when standing inside the cab. This made it impossible to open the door from outside without first climbing up high enough to reach the door handle while hanging on to the side handrails with one hand only. Crews therefore often chose to leave the doors ajar when parking and exiting the locomotives.

Side doors with two interconnected latch handles on the outside, such as those which were introduced on the Class 7E1 with one outside handle mounted near floor level and the other at mid-door level, were also introduced on Class 6E1 locomotives beginning with Series 9.

Service
The Class 6E1 family saw service all over both 3 kV DC mainline and branch line networks, the smaller Cape Western mainline between Cape Town and Beaufort West and the larger network which covers portions of the Northern Cape, the Free State, Natal, Gauteng, North West and Mpumalanga.

Reclassification and rebuilding

Reclassification to Class 16E
During 1990 and 1991, Spoornet semi-permanently coupled several pairs of otherwise largely unmodified Class 6E1 locomotives, reclassified them to Class 16E and allocated a single locomotive number to each pair, with the individual units in the pairs inscribed "A" or "B". The aim was to accomplish savings on cab maintenance by coupling the units at their no. 1 ends, abandoning the no. 1 end cabs in terms of maintenance and using only the no. 2 end cabs. Most pairs were later either disbanded with the units reverting to Class 6E1 and regaining their original numbers or getting rebuilt to Class 18E.

The first two Series 9 locomotives, numbers E2001 and E2002, were built as experimental logic control locomotives. They were the only two Series 9 units to have been reclassified and renumbered to Class 16E, becoming no. 16-500A and B.

Modification to Class 17E
During 1993 and 1994, Class 17E locomotives were modified and reclassified from Class 6E1 Series 7, 8 or 9 locomotives. Key modifications included improved regenerative braking and wheel-slip control to improve their reliability on the steep gradients and curves of the Natal mainline. Unlike the unmodified but reclassified Class 16E locomotives, the Class 17Es retained their original unit numbers after reclassification.

A stumbling block was that the regeneration equipment at many of the sub-stations along the route was unreliable, and since there was no guarantee that another train would be in the same section to absorb the regenerated energy, there was always the risk that line voltage could exceed 4.1 kV, which would make either the sub-station or the locomotive trip out. As a result, the subsequently rebuilt Class 18E locomotives were not equipped with regenerative braking.

Seventy known Series 9 locomotives were reclassified to Class 17E. Their unit numbers are displayed in the table below.

Rebuilding to Class 18E

Beginning in 2000, Spoornet began a project to rebuild Series 2 to 11 Class 6E1 locomotives to Class 18E, Series 1 and Series 2 at the Transnet Rail Engineering (TRE) workshops at Koedoespoort. In the process, the cab at the no. 1 end was stripped of all controls and the driver's front and side windows were blanked off to have a toilet installed, thereby forfeiting the locomotive's bi-directional ability.

Since the driving cab's noise level had to be below 85 decibels, cab 2 was selected as the Class 18E driving cab primarily based on its lower noise level compared to cab 1, which was closer and more exposed to the compressor's noise and vibration. Another factor was the closer proximity of cab 2 to the low voltage switch panel. The fact that the handbrake was located in cab 2 was not a deciding factor, but was considered an additional benefit.

While the earlier Class 6E1, Series 2 to 7 locomotives had been built with a brake system which consisted of various valves connected to each other with pipes, commonly referred to as a "bicycle frame" brake system, the Class 6E1, Series 8 to 11 locomotives were built with an air equipment frame brake system, commonly referred to as a "brake rack". Since the design of the rebuilt Class 18E locomotives included the same brake rack, the rebuilding project was begun with the newer series 8 to 11 locomotives to reduce the overall cost of rebuilding.

The Class 6E1, Series 9 locomotives which were used in this project were all rebuilt to Class 18E, Series 1 locomotives. Their numbers and renumbering details are shown in the table.

Liveries
All the Class 6E1, Series 9 locomotives were delivered in the SAR Gulf Red livery with signal red cowcatchers, yellow whiskers and with the number plates on the sides mounted on three-stripe yellow wings. In the 1990s many of the Series 9 units began to be repainted in the Spoornet orange livery with a yellow and blue chevron pattern on the cowcatchers.

Illustration

References

External links

Bo-Bo locomotives
Cape gauge railway locomotives
2950
Railway locomotives introduced in 1981
Union Carriage & Wagon locomotives